James Harrison is a British sound editor. He was nominated for an Academy Award in the category Best Sound for the film No Time to Die.

Selected filmography 
 No Time to Die (2021; co-nominated with Simon Hayes, Oliver Tarney, Paul Massey and Mark Taylor)

References

External links 

Living people
Place of birth missing (living people)
Year of birth missing (living people)
British sound editors